The Independents were an American R&B vocal group active from 1971 to 1975. They scored several hits on the U.S. Pop and R&B charts. Their 1973 song "Leaving Me" reached No. 21 on the Billboard Hot 100, and remained on the chart for 14 weeks. Sales of over a million copies led to a gold record being awarded by the R.I.A.A. on May 23, 1973.

After the group broke up and recording the solo albums, Passionate Breezes and Gonna Getcha Love, Chuck Jackson, along with fellow group member Marvin Yancy, achieved success as the producers and writers for most of Natalie Cole's early chart releases, and also had success with Phyllis Hyman and Ronnie Dyson. Jackson is the half-brother of the Reverend Jesse Jackson and is not related to singer Chuck Jackson. In 2019, Maurice Jackson reformed The Independents with Theo Huff, Rashan Thompson, Vanessa Lainey, Parkas Alexander and himself.

Members
Charles "Chuck" Jackson - born 22 March 1945, Greenville, South Carolina
Maurice Jackson - born 12 June 1942, Chicago
Helen Curry - born Clarksdale, Mississippi
Eric Thomas - born Chicago
Marvin Jerome Yancy - born 31 May 1950, Chicago

Discography

Albums

Studio albums

Compilation albums

Singles

References

External links 

American rhythm and blues musical groups
Wand Records artists
Musical groups established in 1971
Musical groups disestablished in 1975